Mekan Saparov (born 22 April 1994) is a Turkmen footballer who plays for Turkmen club FC Altyn Asyr. He was part of the Turkmenistan national team from 2014.

Club career 
He began his professional career in 2011 in FC Balkan. In 2013 with FC Balkan he won the 2013 AFC President's Cup in Malaysia. In 2015, he moved for 2 month loan to the FC Ahal.

International career 

Saparow made his senior national team debut on 23 May 2014, in an 2014 AFC Challenge Cup match against Philippines.

He played for Turkmenistan youth team in Commonwealth of Independent States Cup 2012, 2013 and 2015.

He was included in Turkmenistan's squad for the 2019 AFC Asian Cup in the United Arab Emirates.

International goals
Scores and results list Turkmenistan's goal tally first.

Achievements 
 AFC President's Cup: 2013

References

External links

1994 births
Living people
Turkmenistan footballers
Turkmenistan international footballers
Association football defenders
FC Ahal players
2019 AFC Asian Cup players